The 2022 Big 12 Conference football season will be the 27th season of the Big 12 Conference football taking place during the 2022 NCAA Division I FBS football season. The season will begin on September 3 with non-conference play. Conference play will begin on September 24, 2022.

The 2022 season will be the eleventh season for the Big 12 since the early 2010s conference realignment brought the Big 12 membership to its current form. It is also the final year in the ten team configuration, with BYU, Cincinnati, Houston and UCF entering before the 2023 season.
     
The 2022 Big 12 Championship Game was played at AT&T Stadium in Arlington, Texas, on December 3, 2022. The game featured the TCU Horned Frogs and the Kansas State Wildcats.

Background

Previous season

Preseason

Recruiting classes

Big 12 media days
The 2022 Big 12 media days were held on July 13–14, 2022 in Frisco, Texas. The teams and representatives in respective order were as follows:

 Big 12 Commissioner – Brett Yormark
 Baylor – Dave Aranda (HC)
 Iowa State – Matt Campbell (HC)
 Kansas – Lance Leipold (HC)
 Kansas State – Chris Klieman (HC)
 Oklahoma – Brent Venables (HC)
 Oklahoma State – Mike Gundy (HC) 
 TCU – Sonny Dykes (HC)
 Texas – Steve Sarkisian (HC)
 Texas Tech – Joey McGuire (HC)
 West Virginia – Neal Brown (HC)

Preseason poll
The preseason poll was released on July 7, 2022.

First place votes in 

Preseason awards

All−American Teams

Individual awards

Preseason All-Big 12 teams 
2022 Preseason All-Big 12

Offensive Player of the Year: Bijan Robinson, RB, Texas, Jr.
Defensive Player of the Year: Felix Anudike-Uzomah, DE, Kansas State, Jr.
Newcomer of the Year: Dillon Gabriel, QB, Oklahoma, GS

Head coaches

Schedule

All times Central time.

† denotes Homecoming game

Regular season schedule

Week One

Week Two

{{CFB Conference Schedule Entry
| w/l           = w
| date          = September 10
| time          = 3:00 PM
| visiting_rank =
| visiting_team = Iowa State
| home_rank     = 
| home_team     = Iowa| gamename      = Cy-Hawk Series
| site_stadium  = Kinnick Stadium
| site_cityst   = Iowa City, IA
| tv            = BTN
| score         = 10–7
| attend        = 69,250
}}

Week Three

Week Four

Week Five

Week Six

Week Seven

 

 

Week Eight

 

Week Nine

  

 

Week Ten

 

Week Eleven

 

Week Twelve

 
 

Week Thirteen

  

 

Championship Game

Postseason
Bowl games

For the 2020–2025 bowl cycle, The Big-12 will have annually eight appearances in the following bowls: Sugar Bowl (unless they are selected for playoffs filled by a Big-12 team if champion is in the playoffs), First Responder Bowl, Liberty Bowl, Alamo Bowl, Guaranteed Rate Bowl, Cheez-It Bowl and Texas Bowl. The Big-12 teams will go to a New Year's Six bowl if a team finishes higher than the champions of Power Five conferences in the final College Football Playoff rankings. The Big-12 champion are also eligible for the College Football Playoff if they're among the top four teams in the final CFP ranking.

Rankings are from CFP rankings.  All times Central Time Zone. Big-12 teams shown in bold.

Head to head matchups

Updated with the results of all regular season conference games.

Big 12 vs other conferences Regular SeasonPost Season 
Through games of December 31, 2022

Big 12 vs Power 5 matchups
This is a list of the Power Five conferences teams (ACC, Big Ten, Pac-12, Notre Dame and SEC).

Big 12 vs Group of Five matchups
The following games include Big 12 teams competing against teams from The American, C-USA, MAC, Mountain West or Sun Belt.

Big 12 vs FBS independents matchups
The following games include Big 12 teams competing against FBS Independents which include Army, Liberty, New Mexico State, UConn and UMass.

Big 12 vs FCS matchups
The Football Championship Subdivision comprises 13 conferences and two independent programs.

Rankings

Awards and honors

Player of the week honors

Big 12 Individual Awards
The following individuals received postseason honors as voted by the Big 12 Conference football coaches at the end of the season.

All-conference teams

The following players earned All-Big 12 honors. Any teams showing (_) following their name are indicating the number of All-Big 12 Conference Honors awarded to that university for 1st team and 2nd team respectively.First TeamSecond Team(U) - Unanimous SelectionHonorable mentionsBAYLOR: Monaray Baldwin (WR), Jacob Gall (OLoY), Gabe Hall (DL), Gavin Holmes (KR/PR), Siaki Ika (DLoY), Matt Jones (LB), Devin Lemear (DB, DFoY), John Mayers (PK), Micah Mazzccua (OL), Grant Miller (OL), Mark Milton (DB), Isaac Power (P), Hal Presley (WR), Richard Reese (RB), Blake Shapen (QB), Ben Sims (TE), Al Walcott (DB)IOWA STATE:M.J. Anderson (DL), Jeremiah Cooper (DFoY), Hunter Dekkers (QB), Trevor Downing (OLoY), Beau Freyler (DB), Will McDonald IV (DPoY, DLoY), Myles Purchase (DB), Colby Reeder (LB, DNoY), O’Rien Vance (LB) KANSAS: Earl Bostick Jr. (OL), Kenny Logan Jr. (DB), Devin Neal (RB, OPoY), Lonnie Phelps (DNoY, DLoY), Dominick Puni (OL, ONoY)KANSAS STATE: Ekow Boye-Doe (DB), Phillip Brooks (STPoY), D.J. Giddens (OFoY), Hayden Gillum (OL), Daniel Green (LB), Eli Huggins (DL), K.T. Leveston (OL), Adrian Martinez (QB, ONoY), Austin Moore (LB), Kobe Savage (DNoY), Deuce Vaughn (OPoY)OKLAHOMA: Billy Bowman (DB), Justin Broiles (DB), C.J. Coldon (DNoY), Dillon Gabriel (QB), Anton Harrison (OLoY), Marvin Mims (KR/PR), Chris Murray (OL), Andrew Raym (OL), Danny Stutsman (LB), Michael Turk (STPoY), David Ugwoegbu (LB), DaShaun White (LB)OKLAHOMA STATE:Tanner Brown (STPoY), Tyler Lacy (DL), Jabbar Muhammad (DB), Jaden Nixon (KR/PR, OFoY), Brennan Presley (WR), Spencer Sanders (QB), Jake Schultz (FB), Jake Springfield (OL), Jason Taylor II (DPoY), Hunter Woodard (OL) TCU:Alan Ali (ONoY), Steve Avila (OLoY), Taye Barber (WR), Millard Bradford (DB), Bud Clark (DB), Andrew Coker (OL), Brandon Coleman (OL), Derius Davis (WR), Tre’Vius Hodges-Tomlinson (DPoY), Dylan Horton (DL), Jamoi Hodge (LB), Jordy Sandy (P), Jared Wiley (TE), Damonic Williams (DFoY)TEXAS:Bert Auburn (PK), Kelvin Banks Jr. (OFoY, OLoY), Jahdae Barron (DB), Keondre Coburn (DLoY), Anthony Cook (DB), Quinn Ewers (ONoY), Jaylan Ford (DPoY), Roschon Johnson (RB), Christian Jones (OL), Moro Ojomo (DL), Bijan Robinson (OPoY), Keilan Robinson (KR/PR, STPoY), Barryn Sorrell (DL), Jerrin Thompson (DB), T’Vondre Sweat (DL), Ryan Watts (DB, DNoY), Jordan Whittington (WR)TEXAS TECH: Joseph Adedire (DFoY), Jerand Bradley (WR), Tony Bradford Jr. (DL), Jaylon Hutchings (DL), Austin McNamara (P), Krishon Merriweather (LB), Behren Morton (OFoY), Landon Peterson (OL), Myles Price (WR), SaRodorick Thompson (RB), Henry Teeter (FB), Marquis Waters (DB), Dennis Wilburn (OL), Rayshad Williams (DB), Tyree Wilson (DPoY, DLoY), Trey Wolff (PK, STPoY)WEST VIRGINIA: Jasir Cox (DB), C.J. Donaldson (ONoY, OFoY), Zach Frazier (OLoY), Sam James (WR), Jordan Jefferson (DL), Lee Kpogba (LB, DNoY), Wyatt Milum (OL), Dante Stills (DLoY)

All-Americans

Currently, the NCAA compiles consensus all-America teams in the sports of Division I-FBS football and Division I men's basketball using a point system computed from All-America teams named by coaches associations or media sources.  The system consists of three points for a first-team honor, two points for second-team honor, and one point for third-team honor. Honorable mention and fourth team or lower recognitions are not accorded any points. College Football All-American consensus teams are compiled by position and the player accumulating the most points at each position is named first team consensus all-American. Currently, the NCAA recognizes All-Americans selected by the AP, AFCA, FWAA, TSN, and the WCFF to determine Consensus and Unanimous All-Americans. Any player named to the First Team by all five of the NCAA-recognized selectors is deemed a Unanimous All-American.2018 Consensus All-America Team

 List of All American Teams 

 American Football Coaches Association All-America Team
 Associated Press All-America Team
 CBS Sports All-America Team
 ESPN All-America Team
 Football Writers Association of America All-America Team
 The Athletic All-America Team
 Sporting News 2022 College Football All-America Team
 USA Today All-America Team
 Walter Camp Football Foundation All-America Team

All-AcademicFirst teamBAYLOR: Ben Hamilton, Ben Sims, Blake Shapen, Brayden Utley, Brooks Miller, Caleb Parker, Chidi Ogbonnaya, Cooper Lanz, Devin Lemear, Dillon Doyle, Connor Galvin, Garrison Grimes, Grant Miller, Griffin Speaks, Isaac Power, Jacob Gall, John Mayers, Jonathan Davidson, Mark Milton, Noah Rauschenberg, Tevin WIliams III, TJ Franklin, Tripp Mitchell, Tyrone BrownIOWA STATE: Caleb Bacon, Blake Clark, Beau Coberley, Easton Dean, Trevor Downing, Beau Freyler, Connor Guess, Jacob Hillman, Kendell Jackson, Anthony Johnson, Kyle Krezek, Isaiah Lee, Tyler Mark, Myles Mendeszoon, Tyler Moore, Drake Nettles, Blake Peterson, Myles Purchase, Jake Remsburg, Jared Rus, O'Rien Vance, Gerry Vaughn, Hunter ZenzenKANSAS: Tabor Allen, Jelani Arnold, Earl Bostick Jr., Cobee Bryant, Sam Burt, Jared Casey, Mac Copeland, Cam'ron Dabney, Jalon Daniels, Ra'Mello Dotson, Dylan Downing, Emory Duggar, Tommy Dunn Jr., Mason Fairchild, Michael Ford Jr., Donovan Gaines, Luke Grimm, Hayden Hatcher, Kwinton Lassiter, Devin Neal, Mike Novitsky, Cole Petrus, Kelan Robinson, Jackson Satterwhite, Quentin Skinner, Kevin Terry, Reis VernonKANSAS STATE: NIck Allen, Cooper Beebe, Jack Blumer, Jax Dineen, Jace Friesen, Daniel Green, Sam Hecht, Thomas Helten, Robert Hentz, Will Howard, Eli Huggins, Andrew Leingang, KT Leveston, Matthew Maschmeier, Cincere Mason, Nate Matlack, Christian Moore, Austin Moore, Brendan Mott, Beau Palmer, Randen Plattner, Seth Porter, Desmond Purnell, Jake Rubley, Ben Sinnott, Cody Stufflebean, Chris Tennant, Kade Warner, Sammy WheelerOKLAHOMA: Justin Broiles, Kevin Gilliam, Eric Gray, Carsten Groos, Pierce Hudgens, Kasey Kelleher, Jaden Knowles, Ryan Peoples, Zach Schmit, Drake Stoops, Ty Taylor, Michael Turk, Eric Windham, Maureese WrenOKLAHOMA STATE: Constantino Borrelli, Jaden Bray, Cale Cabbiness, Braden Cassity, Kendal Daniels, Trace Ford, Raymond Gay, Bryson Green, Gunnar Gundy, Alex Hale, Matt Hembrough, Tom Hutton, Aden Kelley, Ben Kopenski, Brock Martin, Joe Michalski, Zach Middleton, Collin Oliver, Brennan Presley, Jordan Reagan, Parker Robertson, Eli Russ, Jake Schultz, Jake Springfield, Logan Ward, Ty Williams, Preston Wilson, Hunter Woodard, Zeke ZaragozaTCU: Trent Battle, Chase Curtis, Emari Demercado, Dominic DiNunzio, George Ellis, Alex Honig, Mark Perry, Curtis Raymond, D'Andre Rogers, Jared WileyTEXAS: Parker Alford, Junior Angilau, Bert Auburn, Michael Balis, Ben Ballard, Hudson Card, Zach Edwards, Nathan Hatter, Gunnar Helm, Roschon Johnson, Gabriel Lozano, Jake Majors, Byron Murphy, Ovie Oghoufo, Moro Ojomo, Logan Parr, Devin Richardson, Bijan Robinson, Ja'Tavion Sanders, Ryan Watts, Chad Wolf, Xavier Worthy, Charles WrightTEXAS TECH: Cole Boyd, Jerald Bradley, Tahj Brooks, Blake Burris, Patrick Curley, Kenneth Elder, Charles Esters, Loic Fouonji, Jaylon Hutchings, Jacoby Jackson, Trent Low, Nehemiah Martinez I, Tyrique Matthews, La'Byreous Moore, Behren Morton, Jesiah Pierre, Charles Robinson, Caleb Rodkey, Isaac Smith, Marquis Waters, Cameron Watts, Jett Whitfield, Trey Wolff, Matthew YoungWEST VIRGINIA: Austin Brinkman, Aubrey Burks, Matt Cavallaro, C.J. Cole, Preston Fox, Zach Frazier, Garrett Greene, Jordan Jefferson, Justin Johnson Jr., Casey Legg, Graeson Malashevich, Sean Martin, Wyatt Milum, Doug Nester, Mike O'Laughlin, Kaden Prather, Tomas Rica, Reese Smith, Edward VesterinenSecond teamBAYLOR: Byron Hansard, Christian Morgan, Collin Losack, Drake Dabney, Gavin Byers, Gavin Holmes, Jackie Marshall, Jordan Jenkins, Byron Drones, Matt Jones, Monaray Baldwin, Sqwirl Williams, Tate Williams, Tony AnyanwuIOWA STATE: Aidan Bitter, Hunter Dekkers, DeShawn Hanika, Jarrod Hufford, Stevo Klotz, Carston Marshall, Jaylin Noel, Tyler Onyedim, Cameron Shook, JR Singleton, Malik VerdonKANSAS: Jacob Borcila, Zion DeBose, Daniel Hishaw Jr., Kenny Logan Jr., Steven McBrideKANSAS STATE: Julius Brents, Damian Ilalio, Shane Porter, Deuce Vaughn, Ty ZentnerOKLAHOMA: Nate Anderson, Robert Congel, Reggie Grimes, Jordan Kelley, Reed Lindsey, Jake McCoy, Andre RaymOKLAHOMA STATE: Sione Asi, Clayton Barbour, Caleb Etienne, Jaden NixonTCU: Noah Bolticoff, Andrew Coker, Max Duggan, Gunnar Henderson, Carter Ware, Marcus WilliamsTEXAS: Luke Brockermeyer, Casey Cain, Christian Jones, Barryn Sorrell, Michael Taaffe, Jordan Whittington, Doak WilsonTEXAS TECH: Jackson Baggett, Tony Bradford Jr., Ethan Carde, Jackson Knotts, Austin McNamara, Joseph Plunk, Bryce Ramirez, Bryce Robinson, Tyler Shough, Donovan Smith, Henry Teeter, Mason Tharp, Jack Tucker, Rayshad Williams, Tyree Wilson, Robert Wooten, Weston WrightWEST VIRGINIA: Caden Biser, Caleb Coleman, Tyler Connolly, Treylan Davis, Jairo Faverus, Davis Mallinger, Tony Mathis Jr., Taurus Simmons

National award winnersDavey O'Brien AwardMax Duggan, TCUJohny Unitas Golden Arm AwardMax Duggan, TCUDoak Walker AwardBijan Robinson, TexasPaycom Jim Thorpe AwardTre'Vius Hodges-Tomlinson, TCUWalter Camp Football Foundation Coach of the YearSonny Dykes, TCUESPN's Home Depot National Coach of the YearSonny Dykes, TCUBroyles AwardGarrett Riley, TCUAP Coach of the YearSonny Dykes, TCUEddie Robinson Coach of the YearSonny Dykes, TCUEarl Campbell Tyler Rose Award FinalistsDeuce Vaughn, Kansas State

Max Duggan, TCU

Bijan Robinson, TexasBleacher Report All-America TeamOG Cooper Beebe, Kansas State; RB Bijan Robinson, TexasPhil Steele 2022 All-America First TeamPR Derius Davis, TCU; OL Steve Avila, TCU; LB/DB Tre'Vius Hodges-Tomlinson, TCU; RB Bijan Robinson, Texas; DL Tyree Wilson, Texas TechPhil Steele 2022 All-America Second TeamAP Deuce Vaughn, Kansas State; DL Felix Anudike-Uzomah, Kansas State; QB Max Duggan, TCUPhil Steele 2022 All-America Third TeamDL Siaki Ika, Baylor; WR Xavier Hutchinson, Iowa State; LS Matt Hembrough, Oklahoma State; DB Jason Taylor II, Oklahoma State; LB Jaylan Ford, TexasPhil Steele 2022 All-America Fourth TeamOL Cooper Beebe, Kansas State; WR Quentin Johnston, TCU; C Zach Frazier, West VirginiaPhil Steele 2022 All-America Honorable MentionC Jacob Gall, Baylor; OL Connor Galvin, Baylor; P Michael Turk, Oklahoma; K Tanner Brown, Oklahoma State; AP Malik Knowles, Kansas State; LS Randen Plattner, Kansas State; LB/DB DeMarvion Overshown, Texas; TE Ja'Tavion Sanders, TexasAcademic All-America Team Selected by the College Sports CommunicatorsFirst Team: LB Dillon Doyle, Baylor

Second Team: QB Jalon Daniels, Kansas; OL Earl Bostic Jr., Kansas; DL Sam Burt, Kansas; DL Ovie Oghoufo, Texas; K Casey Legg, West Virginia
Home game announced attendanceBold''' – exceeded capacity
† Season high
‡ Record stadium Attendance

NFL Draft
The following list includes all Big 12 Players who were drafted in the 2023 NFL Draft

Notes

References